Saje or SAJE may refer to:
 Strategic Actions for a Just Economy (SAJE), a non-profit economic justice organization in Los Angeles
 Saje Natural Wellness, a retailer of essential oils and skin care products in Canada and the United States